Martin Koch may refer to:
Martin Koch (orchestrator), British orchestrator, musical supervisor, arranger, and conductor
Martin Koch (novelist) (1882–1940), Swedish novelist
Martin Koch (ski jumper) (born 1982), Austrian ski jumper
Martin Koch (cyclist) (1887–1961), German Olympic cyclist